The President Bridge is a truss bridge that crosses over the Volga river in Ulyanovsk Oblast, Russia, connecting the city of Ulyanovsk with the east side of the city Ulyanovsk.

The bridge's capacity is over 40,000 vehicles per day.

History

The new bridge was built as the aging Ulyanovsk Bridge (built 1913–1916) could no longer cope with the growing traffic. It was constructed as a part of a federal modernization program and aimed at linking the European part of Russia with the Urals, Siberia and the Far East.

The design of the bridge began in 1980, and the construction in 1986, originally planned to take nine years. The first pillars were installed in 1988, and the first span in 1992. It cost a total of 38.4 billion rubles (2008 prices).

The opening ceremony took place on 24 November 2009, and was attended by the Russian President Dmitry Medvedev and Ilham Aliyev, President of Azerbaijan. At this stage only the first part of the bridge was opened; the lower tier of the bridge was scheduled to open in 2012. It took more than 23 years to build the bridge; completion was delayed significantly due to lack of funding and economic difficulties following Russia's transition after the collapse of the Soviet Union.

References

External links

Road bridges in Russia
Bridges completed in 2009
Buildings and structures in Ulyanovsk Oblast
Bridges across the Volga River
Transport in Ulyanovsk Oblast